Jonathan Hall (born 8 October 1972) is an Australian former racing cyclist. He won the Australian national road race title in 1997.

Major results
1995
 1st  Time trial, Oceania Road Championships
1997
 National Road Championships
1st  Road race
1st  Time trial
 1st Stages 5, 11 & 14 Commonwealth Bank Classic
 2nd  Time trial, Oceania Road Championships
 8th Time trial, UCI Road World Championships
1998
 2nd Clásica Memorial Txuma
 2nd Subida a Gorla
 9th Overall Vuelta a La Rioja
1999
 1st  Time trial, Oceania Road Championships
 1st  Time trial, National Road Championships
 3rd Overall Commonwealth Bank Classic
 5th GP d'Europe

References

External links

1972 births
Living people
Australian male cyclists
Sportspeople from Wollongong